

Ha 

 Joseph-Anaclet Habel b. 1895 first elected in 1953 as Liberal member for Cochrane, Ontario.
 Edward Hackett b. 1840 first elected in 1878 as Liberal-Conservative member for Prince County, Prince Edward Island.
 John Thomas Hackett b. 1884 first elected in 1930 as Conservative member for Stanstead, Quebec.
 George Haddow b. 1833 first elected in 1878 as Independent member for Restigouche, New Brunswick.
 Albert Hagar b. 1827 first elected in 1867 as Liberal member for Prescott, Ontario.
 Alexander Haggart b. 1848 first elected in 1908 as Conservative member for Winnipeg, Manitoba.
 John Graham Haggart b. 1836 first elected in 1872 as Conservative member for Lanark South, Ontario.
 David George Hahn b. 1925 first elected in 1963 as Liberal member for Broadview, Ontario.
 Frederick George Hahn b. 1911 first elected in 1953 as Social Credit member for New Westminster, British Columbia.
 Stanley Haidasz b. 1923 first elected in 1957 as Liberal member for Trinity, Ontario.
 Patty Hajdu b. 1966 first elected in 2015 as Liberal member for Thunder Bay—Superior North, Ontario.
 Robert Henry Halbert b. 1870 first elected in 1919 as Independent member for Ontario North, Ontario.
 Frederick Harding Hale b. 1844 first elected in 1887 as Liberal-Conservative member for Carleton, New Brunswick.
 Alfred Dryden Hales b. 1909 first elected in 1957 as Progressive Conservative member for Wellington South, Ontario.
 Allen Haley b. 1844 first elected in 1896 as Liberal member for Hants, Nova Scotia.
 Charles E. Haliburton b. 1938 first elected in 1972 as Progressive Conservative member for South Western Nova, Nova Scotia.
 James Hall b. 1806 first elected in 1874 as Liberal member for Peterborough East, Ontario.
 Robert Newton Hall b. 1836 first elected in 1882 as Liberal-Conservative member for Town of Sherbrooke, Quebec.
 Robert Richard Hall b. 1865 first elected in 1904 as Liberal member for Peterborough West, Ontario.
 Walter Allan Hall b. 1867 first elected in 1925 as Liberal member for Bruce South, Ontario.
 William Samuel Hall b. 1871 first elected in 1935 as Social Credit member for Edmonton East, Alberta.
 Martha Hall Findlay b. 1959 first elected in 2008 as Liberal member for Willowdale, Ontario.
 Howard Hadden Halladay b. 1878   first elected in 1917 as Unionist member for Bow River, Alberta.
 Jasraj Singh Hallan first elected in 2019 as Conservative member for Calgary Forest Lawn, Alberta. 
 Maurice Hallé b. 1906   first elected in 1940 as Liberal member for Brome—Missisquoi, Quebec.
 Bruce Halliday b. 1926   first elected in 1974 as Progressive Conservative member for Oxford, Ontario.
 James Halliday b. 1845 first elected in 1901 as Conservative member for Bruce North, Ontario.
 Ernest Halpenny b. 1903   first elected in 1957 as Progressive Conservative member for London, Ontario.
 Joseph-Irénée-René Hamel b. 1910   first elected in 1945 as Bloc populaire canadien member for St-Maurice—Laflèche, Quebec.
 Charles-André Hamelin b. 1947   first elected in 1984 as Progressive Conservative member for Charlevoix, Quebec.
 Charles James Hamilton b. 1855 first elected in 1925 as Conservative member for Stormont, Ontario.
 Francis Alvin George Hamilton b. 1912   first elected in 1957 as Progressive Conservative member for Qu'Appelle, Saskatchewan.
 Frank Fletcher Hamilton b. 1921   first elected in 1972 as Progressive Conservative member for Swift Current—Maple Creek, Saskatchewan.
 Henry Sidney Hamilton b. 1897   first elected in 1935 as Liberal member for Algoma West, Ontario.
 John Borden Hamilton b. 1913 first elected in 1954 as Progressive Conservative member for York West, Ontario.
 William McLean Hamilton b. 1919 first elected in 1953 as Progressive Conservative member for Notre-Dame-de-Grâce, Quebec.
 William James Hammell b. 1881 first elected in 1921 as Progressive member for Muskoka, Ontario.
 Robert Leith Hanbidge b. 1891 first elected in 1958 as Progressive Conservative member for Kindersley, Saskatchewan.
 Wilfred Hanbury b. 1887 first elected in 1930 as Liberal member for Vancouver—Burrard, British Columbia.
 Art Hanger b. 1943 first elected in 1993 as Reform member for Calgary Northeast, Alberta.
 Brendan Hanley first elected in 2021 as Liberal member for Yukon, Yukon. 
 Adelbert Edward Hanna b. 1863 first elected in 1913 as Conservative member for Lanark South, Ontario.
 Charles Edward Hanna b. 1884 first elected in 1924 as Liberal member for Hastings West, Ontario.
 Richmond Francis Hanna b. 1913 first elected in 1953 as Liberal member for Edmonton—Strathcona, Alberta.
 Hannes Marino Hannesson b. 1884 first elected in 1925 as Conservative member for Selkirk, Manitoba.
 Hugh Hanrahan b. 1947 first elected in 1993 as Reform member for Edmonton—Strathcona, Alberta.
 Ernest George Hansell b. 1895 first elected in 1935 as Social Credit member for Macleod, Alberta.
 Olof Hanson b. 1882   first elected in 1930 as Liberal member for Skeena, British Columbia.
 Richard Hanson b. 1879 first elected in 1921 as Conservative member for York—Sunbury, New Brunswick.
 Mac Harb b. 1953 first elected in 1988 as Liberal member for Ottawa Centre, Ontario.
 Cheryl Hardcastle b. 1961 first elected as New Democratic Party member for Windsor—Tecumseh, Ontario.
 Rachael Harder b. 1986 first elected as Conservative member for Lethbridge, Alberta. 
 Elliott William Hardey b. 1932 first elected in 1984 as Progressive Conservative member for Kent, Ontario.
 Isabel Hardie b. 1916 first elected in 1962 as Liberal member for Northwest Territories, Northwest Territories.
 Ken Hardie b. 1942 first elected in 2015 as Liberal member for Fleetwood—Port Kells, British Columbia.
 Mervyn Arthur Hardie b. 1918 first elected in 1953 as Liberal member for Mackenzie River, Northwest Territories.
 Randolph Harding b. 1914 first elected in 1968 as New Democratic Party member for Kootenay West, British Columbia.
 Louise Hardy b. 1959 first elected in 1997 as New Democratic Party member for Yukon, Yukon.
 Jack Hare b. 1920 first elected in 1978 as Progressive Conservative member for St. Boniface, Manitoba.
 John Hargraft b. 1865 first elected in 1891 as Liberal member for Northumberland West, Ontario.
 Herbert Thomas Hargrave b. 1917 first elected in 1972 as Progressive Conservative member for Medicine Hat, Alberta.
 Douglas Scott Harkness b. 1903 first elected in 1945 as Progressive Conservative member for Calgary East, Alberta.
 Archibald Harley b. 1824 first elected in 1882 as Liberal member for Oxford South, Ontario.
 Harry Cruickshank Harley b. 1926 first elected in 1962 as Liberal member for Halton, Ontario.
 John Paul Harney b. 1931 first elected in 1972 as New Democratic Party member for Scarborough West, Ontario.
 John Harold b. 1873 first elected in 1917 as Unionist member for Brant, Ontario.
 Ed Harper b. 1931 first elected in 1993 as Reform member for Simcoe Centre, Ontario.
 Elijah Harper b. 1949 first elected in 1993 as Liberal member for Churchill, Manitoba.
 Louis George Harper b. 1830 first elected in 1874 as Conservative member for Gaspé, Quebec.
 Stephen Harper b. 1959 first elected in 1993 as Reform member for Calgary West, Alberta.
 Maurice Harquail b. 1938 first elected in 1975 as Liberal member for Restigouche, New Brunswick.
 Hu Harries b. 1921 first elected in 1968 as Liberal member for Edmonton—Strathcona, Alberta.
 Dan Harris b. 1979 first elected in 2011 as New Democratic Party member for Scarborough Southwest, Ontario. 
 Jack Harris b. 1948 first elected in 1987 as New Democratic Party member for St. John's East, Newfoundland and Labrador.
 Joseph Henry Harris b. 1888 first elected in 1921 as Conservative member for York East, Ontario.
 Lloyd Harris b. 1867 first elected in 1908 as Liberal member for Brantford, Ontario.
 Richard M. Harris b. 1944 first elected in 1993 as Reform member for Prince George—Bulkley Valley, British Columbia.
 Walter Edward Harris b. 1904 first elected in 1940 as Liberal member for Grey—Bruce, Ontario.
 Charles Robert Harrison b. 1868 first elected in 1917 as Unionist member for Nipissing, Ontario.
 Jeremy Harrison b. 1978 first elected in 2004 as Conservative member for Churchill River, Saskatchewan.
 John Hornby Harrison b. 1908 first elected in 1949 as Liberal member for Meadow Lake, Saskatchewan.
 Robert Alexander Harrison b. 1833 first elected in 1867 as Conservative member for West Toronto, Ontario.
 James Hart b. 1955 first elected in 1993 as Reform member for Okanagan—Similkameen—Merritt, British Columbia.
 David James Hartigan b. 1887 first elected in 1935 as Liberal member for Cape Breton South, Nova Scotia.
 Maurice Hartt b. 1895 first elected in 1947 as Liberal member for Cartier, Quebec.
 Thomas Aaron Hartt b. 1858 first elected in 1911 as Conservative member for Charlotte, New Brunswick.
 William Harty b. 1847 first elected in 1902 as Liberal member for Kingston, Ontario.
 John Harvard b. 1938   first elected in 1988 as Liberal member for Winnipeg—St. James, Manitoba.
 André Harvey b. 1941 first elected in 1984 as Progressive Conservative member for Chicoutimi, Quebec.
 Luc Harvey b. 1964 first elected in 2006 as Conservative member for Louis-Hébert, Quebec.
 Ross Harvey b. 1952 first elected in 1988 as New Democratic Party member for Edmonton East, Alberta.
 T. J. Harvey b. 1982 first elected in 2015 as Liberal member for Tobique—Mactaquac, New Brunswick. 
 William Harvey b. 1821 first elected in 1872 as Liberal member for Elgin East, Ontario.
 Henry Stanislas Harwood b. 1838 first elected in 1891 as Liberal member for Vaudreuil, Quebec.
 Robert William Harwood b. 1826 first elected in 1872 as Liberal-Conservative member for Vaudreuil, Quebec.
 Andrew Haslam b. 1846 first elected in 1893 as Conservative member for Vancouver, British Columbia.
 Sana Hassainia b. 1974 first elected in 2011 as New Democratic Party member for Verchères—Les Patriotes, Quebec. 
 Horace Haszard b. 1853 first elected in 1904 as Liberal member for West Queen's, Prince Edward Island.
 Heber Harold Hatfield b. 1885 first elected in 1940 as National Government member for Victoria—Carleton, New Brunswick.
 Paul Lacombe Hatfield b. 1873 first elected in 1921 as Liberal member for Yarmouth and Clare, Nova Scotia.
 Frederick James Hawkes b. 1934 first elected in 1979 as Progressive Conservative member for Calgary West, Alberta.
 John Joseph Hawkins b. 1840 first elected in 1882 as Liberal-Conservative member for Bothwell, Ontario.
 Laurie Hawn b. 1947 first elected in 2006 as Conservative member for Edmonton Centre, Alberta.
 Francis Wellington Hay b. 1864 first elected in 1926 as Liberal member for Perth North, Ontario.
 Robert Hay b. 1808 first elected in 1878 as Liberal member for Toronto Centre, Ontario.
 Thomas Hay b. 1872 first elected in 1917 as Unionist member for Selkirk, Manitoba.
 Bryan Hayes b. 1958 first elected in 2011 as Conservative member for Sault Ste. Marie, Ontario. 
 Sharon Ruth Hayes b. 1948 first elected in 1993 as Reform member for Port Moody—Coquitlam, British Columbia.
 William Hayhurst b. 1887 first elected in 1935 as Social Credit member for Vegreville, Alberta.
 Harry Hays b. 1909 first elected in 1963 as Liberal member for Calgary South, Alberta.
 King Hazen b. 1885   first elected in 1940 as National Government member for St. John—Albert, New Brunswick.
 John Douglas Hazen b. 1860 first elected in 1891 as Conservative member for City and County of St. John, New Brunswick.

He 

 Albert Frederick Healy b. 1873 first elected in 1923 as Liberal member for Essex North, Ontario.
 Thomas Patrick Healy b. 1894   first elected in 1940 as Liberal member for St. Ann, Quebec.
 Dan Heap b. 1925   first elected in 1981 as New Democratic Party member for Spadina, Ontario.
 Abraham Albert Heaps b. 1885   first elected in 1925 as Labour Party member for Winnipeg North, Manitoba.
 John Hearn b. 1827 first elected in 1892 as Conservative member for Quebec West, Quebec.
 Loyola Hearn b. 1943   first elected in 2000 as Progressive Conservative member for St. John's West, Newfoundland and Labrador.
 Edmund Heath b. 1813 first elected in 1867 as Conservative member for Pontiac, Quebec.
 Richard Hébert first elected in 2017 as Liberal member for Lac-Saint-Jean, Quebec.
 Peter Heenan b. 1875   first elected in 1925 as Liberal member for Kenora—Rainy River, Ontario.
 George Hees b. 1910   first elected in 1950 as Progressive Conservative member for Broadview, Ontario.
 Kent Hehr b. 1969 first elected in 2015 as Liberal member for Calgary Centre, Alberta. 
 Paul Hellyer b. 1923   first elected in 1949 as Liberal member for Davenport, Ontario.
 Francis Heselton Helme b. 1899   first elected in 1949 as Liberal member for Prince Albert, Saskatchewan.
 Richard Coe Henders b. 1853 first elected in 1917 as Unionist member for Macdonald, Manitoba.
 Charles Albert Henderson b. 1883   first elected in 1940 as Liberal member for Kindersley, Saskatchewan.
 David Henderson b. 1841 first elected in 1888 as Conservative member for Halton, Ontario.
 George Roland Henderson b. 1935   first elected in 1980 as Liberal member for Egmont, Prince Edward Island.
 Robert James Henderson b. 1877   first elected in 1945 as Progressive Conservative member for Lambton—Kent, Ontario.
 Walter Clarence Henderson b. 1891   first elected in 1958 as Progressive Conservative member for Cariboo, British Columbia.
 William James Henderson b. 1916   first elected in 1949 as Liberal member for Kingston City, Ontario.
 Charles Henry b. 1911   first elected in 1949 as Liberal member for Rosedale, Ontario.
 Robert Henry b. 1845 first elected in 1896 as Conservative member for Brant South, Ontario.
 Georges-Henri Héon b. 1902   first elected in 1938 as Independent Conservative member for Argenteuil, Quebec.
 Bernard Rickart Hepburn b. 1876   first elected in 1911 as Conservative member for Prince Edward, Ontario.
 Mitchell Hepburn b. 1896   first elected in 1926 as Liberal member for Elgin West, Ontario.
 Lisa Hepfner b. 1971 first elected in 2021 as Liberal member for Hamilton Mountain, Ontario. 
 Harold Thomas Herbert b. 1922   first elected in 1972 as Liberal member for Vaudreuil, Quebec.
 Elwin Hermanson b. 1952   first elected in 1993 as Reform member for Kindersley—Lloydminster, Saskatchewan.
 Herbert Wilfred Herridge b. 1895   first elected in 1945 as Independent Cooperative Commonwealth Federation member for Kootenay West, British Columbia.
 John Herron b. 1853 first elected in 1904 as Liberal-Conservative member for Provisional District of Alberta, Northwest Territories.
 John Herron b. 1964   first elected in 1997 as Progressive Conservative member for Fundy—Royal, New Brunswick.
 Céline Hervieux-Payette b. 1941   first elected in 1979 as Liberal member for Mercier, Quebec.
 Samuel Rollin Hesson b. 1829 first elected in 1878 as Conservative member for Perth North, Ontario.
 Joseph Ingolph Hetland b. 1896   first elected in 1949 as Liberal member for Humboldt, Saskatchewan.
 Charles Bernhard Heyd b. 1842 first elected in 1897 as Liberal member for Brant South, Ontario.

Hi 

 Charles Erastus Hickey b. 1840 first elected in 1882 as Conservative member for Dundas, Ontario.
 Bonnie Hickey b. 1955   first elected in 1993 as Liberal member for St. John's East, Newfoundland and Labrador.
 Robert Nelson David Hicks b. 1933   first elected in 1984 as Progressive Conservative member for Scarborough East, Ontario.
 William Harold Hicks b. 1888   first elected in 1958 as Progressive Conservative member for Fraser Valley, British Columbia.
 Russ Hiebert b. 1969   first elected in 2004 as Conservative member for South Surrey—White Rock—Cloverdale, British Columbia.
 Gordon Higgins b. 1905   first elected in 1949 as Progressive Conservative member for St. John's East, Newfoundland and Labrador.
 Nathaniel Higinbotham b. 1830 first elected in 1872 as Liberal member for Wellington North, Ontario.
 Ken Higson b. 1934   first elected in 1972 as Progressive Conservative member for Lincoln, Ontario.
 Burton Hill b. 1883   first elected in 1935 as Liberal member for Charlotte, New Brunswick.
 Grant Hill b. 1943   first elected in 1993 as Reform member for Macleod, Alberta.
 Jay Hill b. 1952   first elected in 1993 as Reform member for Prince George—Peace River, British Columbia.
 George Hilliard b. 1827 first elected in 1878 as Liberal-Conservative member for Peterborough West, Ontario.
 Jim Hillyer b. 1974 as Conservative member for Lethbridge, Alberta. 
 Howard Hilstrom b. 1947   first elected in 1997 as Reform member for Selkirk—Interlake, Manitoba.
 Francis Hincks b. 1807 first elected in 1869 as Liberal-Conservative member for Renfrew North, Ontario.
 Betty Hinton b. 1950 first elected in 2000 as Canadian Alliance member for Kamloops, Thompson and Highland Valleys, British Columbia.

Hl 

 Anthony Hlynka b. 1907 first elected in 1940 as Social Credit member for Vegreville, Alberta.

Hn 

 Ray Hnatyshyn b. 1934   first elected in 1974 as Progressive Conservative member for Saskatoon—Biggar, Saskatchewan.

Ho 
 Randy Hoback b. 1967 first elected in 2008 as Conservative member for Prince Albert, Saskatchewan. 
 Frederick George Hoblitzell b. 1891   first elected in 1940 as Liberal member for Eglinton, Ontario.
 Horatio Clarence Hocken b. 1857 first elected in 1917 as Unionist member for Toronto West, Ontario.
 Thomas Hockin b. 1938   first elected in 1984 as Progressive Conservative member for London West, Ontario.
 Adam King Hodgins b. 1859 first elected in 1925 as Conservative member for Middlesex East, Ontario.
 Archie Latimer Hodgins b. 1876   first elected in 1921 as Progressive member for Middlesex East, Ontario.
 George Frederick Hodgins b. 1865 first elected in 1908 as Liberal member for Pontiac, Quebec.
 William Thomas Hodgins b. 1857 first elected in 1891 as Conservative member for Carleton, Ontario.
 Clayton Wesley Hodgson b. 1897   first elected in 1945 as Progressive Conservative member for Victoria, Ontario.
 Jake Hoeppner b. 1936   first elected in 1993 as Reform member for Lisgar—Marquette, Manitoba.
 Robert Alexander Hoey b. 1883   first elected in 1921 as Progressive member for Springfield, Manitoba.
 Andrew Hogan b. 1923   first elected in 1974 as New Democratic Party member for Cape Breton—East Richmond, Nova Scotia.
 Douglas Hogarth b. 1927   first elected in 1968 as Liberal member for New Westminster, British Columbia.
 Gordie Hogg b. 1946 first elected in 2017 as Liberal member for South Surrey—White Rock, British Columbia. 
 Jean-Pierre Hogue b. 1927   first elected in 1988 as Progressive Conservative member for Outremont, Quebec.
 Ed Holder b. 1954 first elected in 2008 as Conservative member for London West, Ontario. 
 Mark Holland b. 1974 first elected in 2004 as Liberal member for Ajax—Pickering, Ontario.
 Daniel Hollands b. 1927   first elected in 1972 as Progressive Conservative member for Pembina, Alberta.
 Allan Henry Hollingworth b. 1918   first elected in 1953 as Liberal member for York Centre, Ontario.
 John Holmes b. 1828 first elected in 1867 as Liberal-Conservative member for Carleton, Ontario.
 John Robert Holmes b. 1927   first elected in 1972 as Progressive Conservative member for Lambton—Kent, Ontario.
 Robert Holmes b. 1852 first elected in 1899 as Liberal member for Huron West, Ontario.
 Ambrose Holowach b. 1914   first elected in 1953 as Social Credit member for Edmonton East, Alberta.
 Simma Holt b. 1922   first elected in 1974 as Liberal member for Vancouver Kingsway, British Columbia.
 Felix Holtmann b. 1944   first elected in 1984 as Progressive Conservative member for Selkirk—Interlake, Manitoba.
 Edward Holton b. 1844 first elected in 1880 as Liberal member for Châteauguay, Quebec.
 Luther Hamilton Holton b. 1817 first elected in 1867 as Liberal member for Châteauguay, Quebec.
 Joshua Attwood Reynolds Homer b. 1827 first elected in 1882 as Liberal-Conservative member for New Westminster, British Columbia.
 Karl Kenneth Homuth b. 1893   first elected in 1938 as Conservative member for Waterloo South, Ontario.
 Russell Honey b. 1921   first elected in 1962 as Liberal member for Durham, Ontario.
 Edmund John Glyn Hooper b. 1818 first elected in 1878 as Liberal-Conservative member for Lennox, Ontario.
 Edward Nicholas Hopkins b. 1855 first elected in 1923 as Progressive member for Moose Jaw, Saskatchewan.
 Leonard Donald Hopkins b. 1930   first elected in 1965 as Liberal member for Renfrew North, Ontario.
 Albert Ralph Horner b. 1913   first elected in 1958 as Progressive Conservative member for The Battlefords, Saskatchewan.
 Hugh Horner b. 1925   first elected in 1958 as Progressive Conservative member for Jasper—Edson, Alberta.
 John H. "Jack" Horner b. 1927   first elected in 1958 as Progressive Conservative member for Acadia, Alberta.
 Norval Alic Horner b. 1930   first elected in 1972 as Progressive Conservative member for Battleford—Kindersley, Saskatchewan.
 Robert Nesbitt Horner b. 1932   first elected in 1984 as Progressive Conservative member for Mississauga North, Ontario.
 Edward Allan Horning b. 1939   first elected in 1988 as Progressive Conservative member for Okanagan Centre, British Columbia.
 Edward Henry Horsey b. 1867 first elected in 1900 as Liberal member for Grey North, Ontario.
 Horace Horton b. 1823 first elected in 1872 as Liberal member for Huron Centre, Ontario.
 Henry Alfred Hosking b. 1908   first elected in 1949 as Liberal member for Wellington South, Ontario.
 William Houck b. 1893   first elected in 1953 as Liberal member for Niagara Falls, Ontario.
 Camillien Houde b. 1889   first elected in 1949 as Independent member for Papineau, Quebec.
 Frédéric Houde b. 1847 first elected in 1878 as Nationalist member for Maskinongé, Quebec.
 Charles Frederick Houghton b. 1839 first elected in 1871 as Liberal member for Yale District, British Columbia.
 Anthony Housefather b. 1973 first elected in 2015 as Liberal member for Mount Royal, Quebec.
 Stan Hovdebo b. 1925   first elected in 1979 as New Democratic Party member for Prince Albert, Saskatchewan.
 Bruce Howard b. 1922   first elected in 1968 as Liberal member for Okanagan Boundary, British Columbia.
 Charles Benjamin Howard b. 1885   first elected in 1925 as Liberal member for Sherbrooke, Quebec.
 Frank Howard b. 1925   first elected in 1957 as CCF member for Skeena, British Columbia.
 John Power Howden b. 1879   first elected in 1925 as Liberal member for St. Boniface, Manitoba.
 Clarence Decatur Howe b. 1886   first elected in 1935 as Liberal member for Port Arthur, Ontario.
 Joseph Howe b. 1804 first elected in 1867 as Anti-Confederate member for Hants, Nova Scotia.
 William Dean Howe b. 1916   first elected in 1963 as New Democratic Party member for Hamilton South, Ontario.
 William Marvin Howe b. 1906   first elected in 1953 as Progressive Conservative member for Wellington—Huron, Ontario.
 Robert Howie b. 1929   first elected in 1972 as Progressive Conservative member for York—Sunbury, New Brunswick.
 William Pierce Howland b. 1811 first elected in 1867 as Liberal-Conservative member for York West, Ontario.

Hs
 Ted Hsu b. 1964 first elected in 2011 as Liberal member for Kingston and the Islands, Ontario.

Hu 

 Charles Hubbard b. 1940 first elected in 1993 as Liberal member for Miramichi, New Brunswick.
 John Hubbs b. 1874 first elected in 1921 as Conservative member for Prince Edward, Ontario.
 Stanley Hudecki b. 1916 first elected in 1980 as Liberal member for Hamilton West, Ontario.
 Jean-Guy Hudon b. 1941 first elected in 1984 as Progressive Conservative member for Beauharnois—Salaberry, Quebec.
 Albert Blellock Hudson b. 1875 first elected in 1921 as Liberal member for Winnipeg South, Manitoba.
 Adam Hudspeth b. 1836 first elected in 1887 as Conservative member for Victoria South, Ontario.
 Joseph Fred Hueglin b. 1937 first elected in 1972 as Progressive Conservative member for Niagara Falls, Ontario.
 Edward Blake Huffman b. 1902 first elected in 1949 as Liberal member for Kent, Ontario.
 Carol Hughes b. 1958 first elected in 2008 as New Democratic member for Algoma—Manitoulin—Kapuskasing, Ontario.
 James Joseph Hughes b. 1856 first elected in 1900 as Liberal member for King's, Prince Edward Island.
 Ken Hughes b. 1954 first elected in 1988 as Progressive Conservative member for Macleod, Alberta.
 Patrick Hughes b. 1831 first elected in 1878 as Liberal member for Niagara, Ontario.
 Samuel Hughes b. 1853 first elected in 1892 as Liberal-Conservative member for Victoria North, Ontario.
 Levi William Humphrey b. 1881 first elected in 1921 as Progressive member for Kootenay West, British Columbia.
 Aylmer Byron Hunt b. 1864 first elected in 1904 as Liberal member for Compton, Quebec.
 John William Gordon Hunter first elected in 1949 as Liberal member for Parkdale, Ontario.
 Lynn Hunter b. 1947 first elected in 1988 as New Democratic Party member for Saanich—Gulf Islands, British Columbia.
 Arthur Ronald Huntington b. 1921 first elected in 1974 as Progressive Conservative member for Capilano, British Columbia.
 Lucius Seth Huntington b. 1827 first elected in 1867 as Liberal member for Shefford, Quebec.
 Pierre-Gabriel Huot b. 1831 first elected in 1867 as Liberal member for Quebec East, Quebec.
 Francis Hurdon b. 1834 first elected in 1867 as Conservative member for Bruce South, Ontario.
 Kenneth Earl Hurlburt b. 1928 first elected in 1972 as Progressive Conservative member for Lethbridge, Alberta.
 Jeremiah M. Hurley b. 1840 first elected in 1896 as Liberal member for Hastings East, Ontario.
 Hilaire Hurteau b. 1837 first elected in 1874 as Liberal-Conservative member for L'Assomption, Quebec.
 Raoul Hurtubise b. 1882 first elected in 1930 as Liberal member for Nipissing, Ontario.
 William James Hushion b. 1883 first elected in 1924 as Liberal member for St. Antoine, Quebec.
 Ahmed Hussen b. 1976 first elected in 2015 as Liberal member for York South—Weston, Ontario.
 Gudie Hutchings b. 1959 first elected in 2015 as Liberal member for Long Range Mountains, Newfoundland and Labrador. 
 William Henry Hutchins b. 1843 first elected in 1891 as Conservative member for Middlesex North, Ontario.
 Richard Hutchison b. 1812 first elected in 1868 as Liberal member for Northumberland, New Brunswick.
 William H. Hutchison b. 1843 first elected in 1896 as Liberal member for City of Ottawa, Ontario.

Hy 

 Bruce Hyer b. 1946 first elected in 2008 as New Democratic member for Thunder Bay—Superior North, Ontario.
 Charles Smith Hyman b. 1854 first elected in 1891 as Liberal member for London, Ontario.
 Keith Hymmen b. 1913 first elected in 1965 as Liberal member for Waterloo North, Ontario.
 Alonzo Hyndman b. 1890 first elected in 1935 as Conservative member for Carleton, Ontario.

H